Finland participated at the 2015 European Games, in Baku, Azerbaijan from 12 to 28 June 2015.

Medalists

Team

Chef de Mission: Leena Paavolainen.

Archery

Badminton

Boxing

Canoe sprint

Cycling

Mountain biking

Road

Diving

Fencing

Gymnastics

Aerobic

Artistic

Men

Individual events

Team all-around event

Parentheses indicate a score discarded for the total.

Rhythmic

Group

Judo

Karate

Shooting

Swimming

Men

Women

Mixed

Table tennis

Taekwondo

Triathlon

Volleyball

Beach

Indoor

Men's tournament

Roster

Head coach:  Lauri Hakala

Preliminary round

Matches

All times are Azerbaijan Summer Time (UTC+05:00).

|}

Pool results

|}

Finland did not advance to quarterfinals and final rank was 9th.

Wrestling

References

Links
 

Nations at the 2015 European Games
European Games
2015